The Sultan Mountains, also known as Sultan Dagh range or Sultan Dag, is a short mountain range on the western edge of the Anatolian Plateau, Turkey with highest elevation of .

The town of Sultandağı is their namesake.

They are made up of metamorphic rocks dating from the Lower Cambrian to the Carboniferous period.

West slopes of Sultan Mountains are part of the Lake Beyşehir drainage basin.

References

Mountain ranges of Turkey
Aegean Region
Central Anatolia Region
Landforms of Afyonkarahisar Province